The 2021 Settimana Internazionale di Coppi e Bartali was a road cycling stage race that took place between 23 and 27 March 2021 in the Italian region of Emilia-Romagna and in San Marino. It was the 36th edition of the Settimana Internazionale di Coppi e Bartali and was part of the 2021 UCI Europe Tour as a category 2.1 event.

Teams
Nine UCI WorldTeams, seven UCI ProTeams, seven UCI Continental teams, and two national teams made up the twenty-five teams that participated in the race. All but three teams entered seven riders;  and  each entered six riders, while  entered only five, for a total of 171 riders. Of these riders, 88 finished.

UCI WorldTeams

 
 
 
 
 
 
 
 
 

UCI ProTeams

 
 
 
 
 
 
 

UCI Continental Teams

 
 
 
 
 
 
 

National Teams

 Italy
 Russia

Route

Stages

Stage 1a 
23 March 2021 — Gatteo to Gatteo,

Stage 1b 
23 March 2021 — Gatteo to Gatteo,   (TTT)

Stage 2 
24 March 2021 — Riccione to Sogliano al Rubicone,

Stage 3 
25 March 2021 — Riccione to Riccione,

Stage 4 
26 March 2021 — City of San Marino (San Marino) to City of San Marino,

Stage 5 
27 March 2021 — Forlì to Forlì,

Classification leadership table 

 On stage 1b, Mark Cavendish, who was second in the points classification, wore the red-and-white jersey, because first-placed Jakub Mareczko wore the white jersey as the leader of the general classification.
 On stage 3, Jakub Mareczko, who was second in the points classification, wore the red-and-white jersey, because first-placed Jonas Vingegaard wore the white jersey as the leader of the general classification.
 On stages 4 and 5, Javier Romo, who was second in the young rider classification, wore the orange jersey, because first-placed Ethan Hayter wore the red-and-white jersey as the leader of the points classification.

Final classification standings

General classification

Points classification

Mountains classification

Young rider classification

Team classification

References

Sources

External links 
 

2021
Settimana Internazionale di Coppi e Bartali
Settimana Internazionale di Coppi e Bartali
Settimana Internazionale di Coppi e Bartali